Lillian Albertson (August 6, 1881 – August 24, 1962) was an American stage and screen actress, and a noted theatrical producer.

Early years 
Born in Indiana, Albertson moved to Los Angeles, California, as a child. She was 19 years old when she decided that she wanted to be an actress.

Acting 
Albertson's acting debut came in 1902 at the Grand Opera House in San Francisco, performing in productions of that theater's stock company. She went from there to the eastern United States to act with a stock company headed by Ralph Stuart.

Albertson's Broadway credits include Malvaloca (1922), The Six-Fifty (1921), The Devil's Garden (1915), Moloch (1915), The Talker (1912), Paid in Full (1908), and The Silver Girl (1907).

She and her husband, Louis O. Macloon, were credited with discovering future film star Clark Gable.

Producing 

After Albertson had acted for two decades, she left New York to go back to California with plans to be a producer. She bought rights to plays that were then popular in the eastern United States and produced them in the West. Her successes included Hit the Deck; Lady Be Good; No, No, Nanette; and The Desert Song. Economic effects of the Great Depression ended the string of successful productions.

Coaching
In the 1940s, Albertson worked for both Paramount and RKO Pictures as a drama coach, and she wrote a book, Motion Picture Acting. She also evaluated prospective actors to determine which ones deserved to have screen tests.

Personal life
On August 22, 1908, Albertson married Abraham Levy, with whom she had a son. Albertson married theatrical producer Louis Macloon in 1922; the couple had no children and divorced eleven years later in 1933.

Death 
On August 24, 1962, Albertson died at her home in Los Angeles, California. She was 81.

Filmography

References

External links

 

 Lillian Albertson at the New York Public Library
1903 portrait(University of Washington, Sayre)

1881 births
1962 deaths
People from Noblesville, Indiana
American theatre managers and producers
American silent film actresses
American stage actresses
Actresses from Indiana
Actresses from Los Angeles
20th-century American actresses